Das Phantom der Oper is a 1916 silent film. Also known as Das Gespenst im Opernhaus, it is notable for being the first film adaptation of the 1910 novel The Phantom of the Opera by Gaston Leroux.

The film is now believed to be a lost film. No copies, photographs or even a poster of the film remain. Text advertisements and a summary  exist. All that is known from these advertisements is that it was made in Germany in autumn 1915, directed by Ernst Matray, starring Nils Olaf Chrisander as the Phantom and Aud Egede-Nissen as Christine. Raoul was played by director Ernst Matray.

Production background 
The film Das Phantom der Oper was shot in autumn 1915 in Germany and was released in 1916.

The script was written by Greta Schröder. The director, Ernst Matray, became her husband. The film lasted 76 minutes (16 frames per second, 5 rolls of film, the total length of the film was 1381 meters).

Cast
 Nils Olaf Chrisander as Erik
 Aud Egede-Nissen as Christine Daaé
 Ernst Matray as Raoul

See also 
List of lost films

References

External links
 
Further information on the film from thephantomonfilm.com.

1916 films
1916 horror films
German silent feature films
Films of the German Empire
Films based on The Phantom of the Opera
Lost horror films
Lost German films
German black-and-white films
German horror films
1916 lost films
Films shot in Germany
Silent horror films
1910s German films